The 2002–03 St. John's Red Storm men's basketball team represented St. John's University during the 2002–03 NCAA Division I men's basketball season. The team was coached by Mike Jarvis in his fifth year. St. John's home games are played at Carnesecca Arena, then called Alumni Hall, and Madison Square Garden and the team is a member of the Big East Conference.

Off season

Departures

Class of 2002 signees

Transfer additions

Roster

Schedule and results

|-
!colspan=9 style="background:#FF0000; color:#FFFFFF;"| Exhibition

|-
!colspan=9 style="background:#FF0000; color:#FFFFFF;"| Non-Conference Regular Season

|-
!colspan=9 style="background:#FF0000; color:#FFFFFF;"| Big East Conference Regular Season

|-
!colspan=9 style="background:#FF0000; color:#FFFFFF;"| Big East tournament

|-
!colspan=9 style="background:#FF0000; color:#FFFFFF;"| NIT Tournament

References

St. John's Red Storm men's basketball seasons
St. John's
St. John's
St John
St John